Mason County, Virginia has existed twice in the U.S. state of Virginia's history. Formed in 1788, and 1804, respectively, both counties were named for  George Mason, a Virginia delegate to the 1787 Constitutional Convention, and each was separated from Virginia due to the creation of a new state, partitioned in accordance with Article IV, Section 3, Clause 1 of the United States Constitution. The two counties continued in existence as:
 Mason County, Kentucky, separated when Kentucky was admitted to the Union in 1792.
 Mason County, West Virginia, separated when West Virginia was admitted to the Union in 1863.

See also
 Former counties, cities, and towns of Virginia

Pre-statehood history of Kentucky
Pre-statehood history of West Virginia
Former counties of Virginia
1788 establishments in Virginia
1804 establishments in Virginia